The 2021 Critérium du Dauphiné was the 73rd edition of the Critérium du Dauphiné, a road cycling stage race in the titular region of southeastern France. The race took place between 30 May and 6 June 2021.

Teams 
All nineteen UCI WorldTeams and two UCI ProTeams made up the twenty-one teams that participated in the race. Each team fielded a squad of seven riders, for a total of 147 riders, from which there were 118 finishers.

UCI WorldTeams

 
 
 
 
 
 
 
 
 
 
 
 
 
 
 
 
 
 
 

UCI ProTeams

Route 
On 22 February 2021, the race organisers, the Amaury Sport Organisation (ASO), announced the route at a presentation in Lyon.

Stages

Stage 1 
30 May 2021 — Issoire to Issoire,

Stage 2 
31 May 2021 — Brioude to Saugues,

Stage 3 
1 June 2021 — Langeac to Saint-Haon-le-Vieux,

Stage 4 
2 June 2021 — Firminy to Roche-la-Molière,  (ITT)

Stage 5 
3 June 2021 — Saint-Chamond to Saint-Vallier,

Stage 6 
4 June 2021 — Loriol-sur-Drôme to Le Sappey-en-Chartreuse,

Stage 7 
5 June 2021 — Saint-Martin-le-Vinoux to La Plagne,

Stage 8 
6 June 2021 — La Léchère-les-Bains to Les Gets,

Classification leadership table 

 On stage 2, Sonny Colbrelli, who was second in the points classification, wore the green jersey, because first placed Brent Van Moer wore the yellow jersey as the leader of the general classification. For the same reason, Cyril Gautier, who was second in the mountains classification, wore the blue polka-dot jersey, and Patrick Gamper, who was second in the young rider classification, wore the white jersey.

Final classification standings

General classification

Points classification

Mountains classification

Young rider classification

Team classification

Notes

References

External links 
 

2021 UCI World Tour
2021 in French sport
2021
May 2021 sports events in France
June 2021 sports events in France